This is a list of the Indian Regional Transport Offices and the assigned codes for vehicle registration. These are broken down to states or Union Territories and their districts.

AN—Andaman and Nicobar

AP—Andhra Pradesh 

The Andhra Pradesh state government has decided to issue uniform registration numbers for vehicles across Andhra Pradesh. From February 2019, all new vehicles in Andhra Pradesh are registered with all code by default.

AR—Arunachal Pradesh

AS—Assam

BR—Bihar

CG—Chhattisgarh

CH—Chandigarh

DD—Dadra and Nagar Haveli and Daman and Diu

DL—Delhi

GA—Goa

GJ—Gujarat

HP—Himachal Pradesh

HR—Haryana

JH—Jharkhand

JK—Jammu and Kashmir

KA—Karnataka

KL—Kerala

LA—Ladakh

LD—Lakshadweep

MH—Maharashtra

ML—Meghalaya

MN—Manipur

MP—Madhya Pradesh

MZ—Mizoram

NL—Nagaland

OD—Odisha 
Due to the official respelling of the state name in English (from "Orissa" to "Odisha"), the Transport Department modified the state letter on the plates with OD substituting OR on 1 September 2012.

PB—Punjab

PY—Puducherry

RJ—Rajasthan

SK—Sikkim

TN—Tamil Nadu 
In Tamil Nadu, specific series are exclusively used for certain type of vehicles
 All State Transport Corporation vehicles start the series with 'N' or 'AN'
 All Government owned vehicles start the series with 'G',  'AG', 'BG', 'CG' or 'DG', Etc., (all Combination of G)

TR—Tripura

TS—Telangana 

Note * Part of GHMC Hyderabad but not part of Hyderabad Dist.

UK—Uttarakhand

UP—Uttar Pradesh

WB—West Bengal

References

Sources 

 for India as whole: Ministry of Road Transport and Highways (click on "List of RTO's in a State")
 for Andhra Pradesh: Government of Andhra Pradesh – Transport Department
 for Delhi: Department of Transport
 for Gujarat: Transport Department Gujarat
 for Himachal Pradesh: Transport Department
 for Karnataka: Government of Karnataka – Transport Department
 for Kerala: Motor Vehicles Department, Newspaper article in the Hindu: "New Registering Authority Codes from July 1"
 for Madhya Pradesh: M.P. Transport Statistics
 for Maharashtra: Motor Vehicle Department
 for Orissa: Orissa Commerce & Transport Department
 for Punjab: Government of Punjab – Department of Transport
 for Tamil Nadu: Department of Transport, State Transport Authority, GIS representation
 for Telangana: Telangana Transport Information Portal
 for Uttarakhand: Uttarakhand Transport Department.

India RTO districts
RTO
Districts of India-related lists
India government-related lists